Douglas Bell (born 5 September 1959) is a Scottish former footballer.

Career

Player
Bell played for Cumbernauld Colts, St Mirren, Aberdeen, Rangers, Hibernian, Shrewsbury Town, Hull City, Cork City, Birmingham City, Partick Thistle, Portadown, Clyde, Elgin City, Alloa Athletic, Albion Rovers and Linlithgow Rose.

During his time with Aberdeen, Bell won the Scottish League three times and the Scottish Cup twice, as well as the European Super Cup in 1983 (missing other trophy wins earlier that year due to injury). He was a league champion again with Rangers in 1987.

Coach
Bell took temporary charge of Clyde in January 2008, after Colin Hendry resigned from his position of manager. Bell was in control of the team for the matches against Dundee and Hamilton Academical. He was sent from the dugout to the stand in both matches, and received a 10 match touchline ban.

Bell took charge of the Clyde reserve team for the 2007–08 campaign, and won the Reserve League Cup. He was promoted to the position of assistant manager in June 2008.

Carer

Dougie Bell also worked as a carer in Harmeny Residential in the late 2000s to early 2010s.

References

External links 

Living people
1959 births
Footballers from Paisley, Renfrewshire
Association football midfielders
Scottish footballers
Scotland under-21 international footballers
Cumbernauld Colts F.C. players
St Mirren F.C. players
Rangers F.C. players
Aberdeen F.C. players
Hibernian F.C. players
Shrewsbury Town F.C. players
Hull City A.F.C. players
Birmingham City F.C. players
Partick Thistle F.C. players
Portadown F.C. players
Clyde F.C. players
Elgin City F.C. players
Alloa Athletic F.C. players
Albion Rovers F.C. players
Linlithgow Rose F.C. players
Scottish Football League players
English Football League players
Scottish Junior Football Association players
Scottish football managers
Clyde F.C. non-playing staff